Angus Konstam (born 2 January 1960) is a Scottish writer of popular history. Born in Aberdeen, Scotland and raised on the Orkney Islands, he has written more than a hundred books on maritime history, naval history, historical atlases, with a special focus on the history of piracy.

Early life 
Although born in Aberdeen, Scotland, he was raised in the Orkney Islands. In 1978, after leaving Kirkwall Grammar School at the age of 18 he left to join the Royal Navy. After initial officer training at the Britannia Royal Naval College, Dartmouth, and undergoing further naval training at sea, he went on to study history at Aberdeen University. During this time he was attached to the Aberdeen University Royal Naval Unit, and its tender, HMS Thornham. After receiving an MA degree, he returned to active service with the Royal Navy, during which time he visited many places that would later be written about in his books, including the Caribbean. He also gained useful knowledge of military service, customs, seamanship and navigation during this time. After leaving the service in 1983 he  studied for a master's degree at the University of St Andrews. During this time he explored the new field of maritime archaeology and wrote his thesis on early naval artillery. Two decades later this formed the basis for Sovereigns of the Sea, his history of Renaissance warships.

Career

United Kingdom 
He left the navy in 1983, and the following year he began a Master of Letters in Maritime Studies at the University of St Andrews, a course which combined history with maritime archaeology. After completing his Masters thesis on Renaissance Naval Artillery, he found a job in 1985 as a supervisor on an excavation in the River Thames near the Tower of London, paid for by the Royal Armouries. While he was working in the Royal Armouries, The Tower and the Kremlin decided to swap exhibits – a "Treasures of the Tower" being shown in Moscow while "Treasures of the Kremlin" came to London. At the same time the curators of both museums were encouraged to exchange information, and to examine each other's collections. This ended up with Konstam studying the 18th century Russian military. A mutual colleague introduced him to a historian working for Osprey Publishing, who turned out to want someone to write a book about Peter the Great's Army. The result was two small (15,000-word) books which first appeared in 1993 – the first easily  accessible account of the foundation of the Russian army to appear in English.

United States 
Konstam moved to Key West, Florida in 1995 and became the Chief Curator in the Mel Fisher Maritime Heritage Museum. Mel Fisher was a treasure hunter who found the wreck of the Spanish treasure galleon Nuestra Señora de Atocha off the Florida Keys. One of his jobs during this time was to create traveling exhibits which toured the United States. During the research for a pirate exhibition, he became increasingly interested in the subject of 18th century piracy. He spent six years in Key West and wrote several more books, there, including The History of Pirates (2002). As he gained more information through his research, he produced Piracy: The Complete History (2008), and then, to reach a wider audience, The World Atlas of Pirates (2009). In 2019 he published The Pirate World, an adaptation of his 2009 work for the same publisher. Konstam also published a biography of the pirate Blackbeard.

Present 
In early 2001 he returned to the United Kingdom, and after living in London and then Edinburgh, he returned to Orkney in 2019. He now resides in Herston  in South Ronaldsay. Konstam continues to research and write about naval and maritime history. Since 2001 he has written extensively on a number of maritime subjects.  He currently has over a hundred books in print, He served a three-year term as the Chair of The Society of Authors in Scotland and has also served on the board of Publishing Scotland, as well as on other heritage-related committees. In addition, Konstam has also been a "talking head" on many cable TV and radio shows, and makes frequent appearances at book festivals and history events.

Complete list of works

General
100 Greatest  Battles Osprey Publishing 2023 ISBN 9781472856944
Mutiny on the Spanish Main: HMS Hermione and the Royal Navy's revenge  Osprey Publishing 2020  .
Hunt the Bismarck: The pursuit of Germany's most famous battleship  Osprey Publishing 2019  . 
The Pirate World   Osprey Publishing 2019  . 
Viking Warrior: Operations Manual   Haynes Publishing 2018   .
Big Guns: Artillery on the Battlefield  Casemate Publishers 2017   .
Jutland 1916: Twelve hours to win the war   Aurum Press 2016  . 
Pirates: Predators of the Seas   Skyhorse Publishing 2016  . with Roger Kean
Battleship Bismarck, 1936-41:Owner's Workshop Manual  Haynes Publishing 2015  . 
Bannockburn: Scotland's greatest battle for Independence   Aurum Press 2014 . 
Naval Miscellany   Osprey Publishing 2010    .  
The World Atlas of Pirates  The Lyons Press 2010   .
The Battle of North Cape: The death-ride of the Scharnhorst, 1943  Pen & Sword Maritime 2009  .
There Was a Soldier: First-Hand Accounts of the Scottish Soldier from 1707 to the Present Day  Hachette Scotland 2009  .
Piracy: The Complete History   Osprey Publishing 2008  .
Sovereigns of the Sea: The Quest to Build the Perfect Renaissance Battleship  John Wiley & Sons 2008  .
Cities of the Renaissance World  Compendium Publishing 2008   .  with Michael Swift 
Salerno 1943: The Allied invasion of Italy  Pen & Sword Military 2007  .
Blackbeard: America's Most Notorious Pirate   John Wiley & Sons 2006  .
Ghost Ships: Tales of Abandoned, Doomed and Haunted Vessels  Greenwich Editions 2005  0. 
Civil War Ghost Stories   Thunder Bay Press 2005  .
PT Boat Squadrons: US Navy Torpedo Boats   Ian Allen 2005 (Spearhead Series)  . 
The Pocket Book of Civil War Battle Sites   Chartwell books 2004 .
The Pocket Book of Civil War Weapons   Chartwell Books 2004  .
7th U-Boat Flotilla: Dönitz's Atlantic Wolves   Ian Allen 2003 (Spearhead Series) . with Jak P. Mallmann Showell
Hunt the Bismarck   Naval Institute Press 2003  .
The Civil War: A Visual Encyclopedia  PRC Publishing 2001   (General Editor)
Warships: From the Galley to the Present Day    PRC Publishing 2001  . with Leo Marriott and Nick Grant.

Historical Atlas Series
Historical Atlas of the Renaissance   Checkmark Books 2004  . as Robert Ritchie  
Historical Atlas of the Napoleonic Era  The Lyons Press 2003  . 
Historical Atlas of Ancient Greece Checkmark Books 2003  . 
Historical Atlas of the Viking World   Thalamus Publishing 2002 . 
Historical Atlas of the Crusades   Thalamus Publishing 2002  . 
Historical Atlas of the Celtic World  Checkmark Books 2001   . 
Historical Atlas of Exploration   Checkmark Books 2000  .
Atlas of Medieval Europe Checkmark Books 2000  . 
The History of Shipwrecks   Lyons Press 1999  . 
The History of Pirates Lyons Press 1999  .

Osprey Publishing Titles 
 British Aircraft Carriers 1945-2010 [New Vanguard Title 317] Osprey Publishing 2023 ISBN 9781472856876
 Naval Battle of Crete 1941: The Royal Navy at Breaking Point [Campaign title 388] ISBN 9781472854049
 British/Commonwealth Cruiser vs Italian Cruiser 1940-43 [Duel title 123] Osprey Publishing 2022 ISBN 9781472849687
 Barents Sea 1942: The Battle for Russia's Arctic Lifeline [Campaign title 376] Osprey Publishing 2022 ISBN 9781472848451
 Warships in the Baltic Campaigns 1918-20 [New Vanguard title 305] Osprey Publishing 2022 
 British Gunboats of Victoria's Empire [New Vanguard title 304] Osprey Publishing 2022 ISBN 9781472851581 
 Warships in the Spanish Civil War [New Vanguard title 300] Osprey Publishing 2021 ISBN 9781472848673. 
Big Guns in the Atlantic: Germany's battleships and cruisers raid the convoys, 1939-41 [Raid title 55] Osprey Publishing 2021 ISBN 9781472845979.   
Sinking Force Z  1941: The day the Imperial Japanese Navy killed the battleship [Air Campaign title 20] Osprey Publishing 2021  . 
 North Cape 1943: The Sinking of the Scharnhorst [Campaign title 356] Osprey Publishing 2020  .
 British Battleship v German Battleship 1941-43 [Duel title 107] Osprey Publishing 2020  .
 British Battleships 1890-1905  [New Vanguard title 290] Osprey Publishing 2020  .
 American Privateers of the Revolutionary War [New Vanguard title 279] Osprey Publishing 2019  .                                                                                   
 British Escort Carriers, 1941-45 [New Vanguard title 274] Osprey Publishing 2019   .                                                                                             
 Tirpitz in Norway: X-craft midget submarines raid the fjords, Operation Source 1943 [Raid title 51] Osprey Publishing 2019  .
 European Ironclads 1860-75   [New Vanguard title 269] Osprey Publishing 2019  .                                                                                                           
 British Ironclads 1860-75 [New Vanguard title 262] Osprey Publishing 2018    .                                                                      
 Sink the Tirpitz, 1942-44 [Air Campaign title 7]  Osprey Publishing 2018   .
 British Destroyers 1939-45 (2): Wartime-built classes [New Vanguard title 253] Osprey Publishing 2017    .                                         
 British Destroyers 1939-45 (1):  Pre-war classes [New Vanguard title 246] Osprey Publishing, 2017  .                                
 River Plate 1939:The Sinking of the Graf Spee [Campaign title 171] Osprey Publishing 2016   .
 British Commando 1940-45  [Warrior title  181] Osprey Publishing 2016  .
 The Barbary Pirates 15th-17th Centuries [Elite title  213]   Osprey Publishing 2016   .
 Nile River Gunboats 1882-1918 [New Vanguard title 239] Osprey Publishing 2016   .     
 U-47 in Scapa Flow: The Sinking of the Royal Oak, 1939  [Raid title 33] Osprey Publishing 2015    .         
 Taranto 1940: The Fleet Air Arm's precursor to Pearl Harbor [Campaign title 288] Osprey Publishing 2015   .
 Commonwealth Cruisers 1939-45 [New Vanguard title 226] Osprey Publishing 2015   .
 Byzantine warship vs Arab warship, 7th - 11th centuries   [Duel title 64] Osprey Publishing 2015   .
 Gunboats of World War 1 [New Vanguard title 221] Osprey Publishing 2015   .                  
 Salerno 1943: The Allies invade southern Italy [Campaign title 257] Osprey Publishing 2015    .
 British Battleships 1914-18 (2): The Super-Dreadnoughts [New Vanguard title 204] Osprey Publishing 2013    .                                                
 British Battleships, 1914-18 (1): The Early Dreadnoughts [New Vanguard title 200] Osprey Publishing 2013   .                                            
 Blackbeard's Last Fight: Pirate Hunting in North Carolina 1718 [Raid title 37] Osprey Publishing 2013    .
 British Light Cruisers 1939-45 [New Vanguard title 194] Osprey Publishing 2012   .                             
 British Heavy Cruisers 1939-45 [New Vanguard title 190] Osprey Publishing 2012  .                 
 The Great Expedition: Sir Francis Drake on the Spanish Main 1585-86  [Raid title 11] Osprey Publishing 2011   . 
 Warships of the Anglo-Dutch Wars [New Vanguard title 183] Osprey Publishing 2011  .       
 Nelson [Command title 14] Osprey Publishing 2011   .  
 The Bismarck 1941: Hunting Germany’s greatest battleship   [Campaign title 232] Osprey Publishing 2011   . 
 Yangtze River Gunboats 1900-49 45  [New Vanguard title 181] Osprey Publishing 2011    .                                   
 Pirate: The Golden Age   [Warrior title 158] Osprey Publishing 2011 with Dave Rickman  . 
 British Aircraft Carriers 1939-45 [New Vanguard title 168] Osprey Publishing 2010    .
 Strongholds of the Picts: The Forts of Dark Age Scotland  [Fortress title 85]  Osprey Publishing 2010   . 
 Marlborough [Command title 10] Osprey Publishing 2010   . 
 British Motor Gunboat 1939-45  [New Vanguard title 166] Osprey Publishing 2009   .  
 Scapa Flow: The defences of Britain’s great fleet anchorage, 1914-45  [Fortress title 85]  Osprey Publishing 2009   .
 British Battleships 1939-45 (2): Nelson and King George V Classes  [New Vanguard title 160] Osprey Publishing 2009    .     
 British Battleships 1939-45 (1): Queen Elizabeth and Royal Sovereign Classes  [New Vanguard title 154]  Osprey Publishing 2009 .       
 British Forts in the Age of Arthur [Fortress title 80]  Osprey Publishing 2008   .
 Tudor Warships (2): Elizabeth I’s Navy [New Vanguard title 149] Osprey Publishing 2008   . 
 Tudor Warships (1): Henry VIII’s Navy [New Vanguard title 142] Osprey Publishing 2008    .                                                                       
 The Forts of Celtic Britain  [Fortress title 50]  Osprey Publishing 2006   . 
 Confederate Submarines and Torpedo Vessels 1861-65  [New Vanguard title 103] Osprey Publishing 2004   .                            
 Spanish Galleon 1530-1690  [New Vanguard title 94] Osprey Publishing 2004    .              
 Seven Days Battles 1862: Lee’s Defense of Richmond  [Campaign title 133] Osprey Publishing 2004    .
 Confederate Blockade Runner 1861-65 45  [New Vanguard title 90] Osprey Publishing 2004   . 
 British Battlecruisers 1939-45  [New Vanguard title 88] Osprey Publishing 2003   . 
 British Motor Torpedo Boat 1939-45  [New Vanguard title 74] Osprey Publishing 2003     . 
 Fair Oaks 1862: McClellan’s Peninsula Campaign [Campaign title 124] Osprey Publishing 2003   .
 The Pirate Ship 1660-1730 New Vanguard title 70] Osprey Publishing 2003     .
 Lepanto 1571: The greatest naval battle of the Renaissance  [Campaign title 114] Osprey Publishing 2003  . 
 Confederate Raider 1861-65 [New Vanguard title 64] Osprey Publishing 2002    .            
 American Civil War Fortifications (1): Coastal brick and stone forts  [Fortress title 14]  Osprey Publishing 2003   . 
 Renaissance War Galley 1470-1590  [New Vanguard title 62] Osprey Publishing 2002  .  
 Union River Ironclad 1861-65  [New Vanguard title 56] Osprey Publishing 2002   .                            
 Mississippi River Gunboat 1861-65  [New Vanguard title 49] Osprey Publishing 2002     .                               
 Guilford Courthouse 1781: Lord Cornwallis’s ruinous victory  [Campaign title 109] Osprey Publishing 2002   . 
 Union Monitor 1861-65  [New Vanguard title 45]  Osprey Publishing 2002     .                
 Hampton Roads 1862: First clash of the Ironclads  [Campaign title 103] Osprey Publishing 2002     . 
 British Napoleonic Ship-of-the-Line  [New Vanguard title 42]  Osprey Publishing 2001   . 
 Privateers and Pirates 1730-1830  [Elite title 74]  Osprey Publishing 2001    . 
 Confederate Ironclad 1861-65  [New Vanguard title 41]  Osprey Publishing 2001     . 
 The Armada Campaign 1588: The Great Enterprise against England  [Campaign title 86]  Osprey Publishing 2001   .           
 Elizabethan Sea Dogs, 1560-1605 [Elite title 70]   Osprey Publishing 2000   . 
 Buccaneers 1620-1700  [Elite title 69] Osprey Publishing 2000    . 
 San Juan Hill 1898: America’s emergence as a world power [Campaign title 57] Osprey Publishing 1998   .                 
 Pirates 1660-1730  [Elite title 67] Osprey Publishing 1998    . 
 Russian Army of the Seven Years War (2)  [Men-at-Arms title 298] Osprey Publishing 1996   .
 Russian Army of the Seven Years War (1)  [Men-at-Arms title 297] Osprey Publishing 1996   .
 Pavia 1525: The  climax of the Italian Wars  [Campaign title 44]  Osprey Publishing 1996   .              
 Poltava 1709: Russia Comes of Age  [Campaign title 34] Osprey Publishing 1994    .                  
 Peter the Great's Army (2): Cavalry  [Men-at-Arms title 264] Osprey Publishing 1993    .
 Peter the Great's Army (1): Infantry  [Men-at-Arms title 260] Osprey Publishing 1993  .

References

External links
Official Web Site
Orkney Wargames

1960 births
Living people
Scottish archaeologists
20th-century Scottish historians
21st-century Scottish historians
Writers from Orkney
Alumni of the University of Aberdeen
Alumni of the University of St Andrews
Graduates of Britannia Royal Naval College